Richard Quentin Fuller (born 30 May 1962) is a British politician who served as the Economic Secretary to the Treasury from July to October 2022. He has been Member of Parliament (MP) for North East Bedfordshire since 2019. A member of the Conservative Party, he represented Bedford from 2010 to 2017. He had previously achieved prominence as a leader of the Young Conservatives.

Early life
Fuller was educated at Hazeldene School and Bedford Modern School (then a direct grant school), followed by University College, Oxford (1981–84), where he studied Politics, Philosophy & Economics, and Harvard Business School (1987–89) for his MBA.

Fuller was President of the Oxford University Conservative Association (OUCA) in 1983. Following the failed nomination of Conservative candidates for the Oxford University Student Union (OUSU), Oxford's student paper Cherwell ran the headline "OUCA falls apart" and Fuller lost a vote of confidence but remained in office. As President, Fuller also provided the first Conservative Party platform for the African National Congress, then a proscribed terrorist organisation in then still apartheid South Africa but not proscribed in the UK.

Professional career
Fuller joined the management consultancy company, LEK Consulting in 1984 as part of their first intake of university graduates.  In 1986, Fuller transferred to Sydney to help establish the Australian practice of LEK. After Harvard Business School, he worked in South Korea, before rejoining LEK in Australia and then working for two years on assignment with the Philippine Long Distance Telephone Company (PLDT) in Manila, Philippines.  In 2000, he joined the alternative assets firm, Investcorp, to help establish their technology ventures group. Fuller joined the board of the Osborne Association, a New York-based charity working with offenders and ex-offenders in 2002. Fuller moved to the United States in 2004 and rejoined LEK in Los Angeles in 2007. He became a non-executive director of Impero Software prior to returning to Parliament in 2019.

Political career
Fuller joined the Conservative party and began delivering leaflets for Trevor Skeet, the MP for Bedford during the 1979 general election. As a Young Conservative Fuller became a member of the moderate (Tory Reform Group) faction that controlled the National Young Conservatives, in opposition to Monday Club and libertarian elements attempting to wrest control of the movement.

Young Conservatives
Fuller was elected National Chairman of the Young Conservatives from 1985 to 1987, campaigning on social issues such as housing, changes to drugs policies as well as on tackling unemployment.

Fuller continued the anti-apartheid policies initiated under previous YC chairmen Iain Picton, Phil Pedley and John Guthrie. His position was backed by the YC National Conference which endorsed in a motion at the 1986 Conference despite vocal opposition from right-wing FCS members.  'This conference utterly condemns the apartheid regime in South Africa and congratulates the firm stand of the Foreign Secretary in seeking a rapid and peaceful transformation of South African society.'

National YC Report on Infiltration & Extremism
The National YC Report was passed in 1984 under Phil Pedley's Chairmanship. Fuller resisted pressure from Conservative Central Office to withdraw support from Pedley who (along with the BBC) was being sued by Harvey Proctor, Neil Hamilton and Gerald Howarth. When the BBC Governors suddenly intervened and ordered the trial be abandoned, Fuller voiced his concerns as to why the trial had been abruptly abandoned. Addressing an Eastern Area Young Conservative Conference, he said: "I find it strange that they have apparently decided to settle now, when things appeared to be going well." Concern grew over the actions of Malcolm McAlpine, a BBC Governor and a cousin of Alistair McAlpine, the treasurer of the Conservative Party. "He denied yesterday that he had promised Mr Hamilton that he could "deliver" the governors behind a settlement." The Times reported that: "Mr Richard Fuller, YC Chairman and a member of the group which endorsed the infiltration report by 39 votes to one, pledged financial backing to Philip Pedley who announced he was fighting on."

Parliament
Fuller stood as the Conservative candidate for the Bedford constituency in the 2005 general election, losing to the incumbent Labour MP Patrick Hall. Fuller stood again for the Bedford constituency in the 2010 general election, and was elected to office on 6 May 2010, replacing Patrick Hall. He was re-elected in the 2015 general election, but lost to the Labour candidate in the 2017 general election. As MP, Fuller led successful campaigns to retain key services at Bedford Hospital and to enable the establishment of Bedford Free School. Fuller launched a venture fund to invest in local businesses and ran the Bedford Community Business School. In October 2014, Fuller was one of 39 Conservative MPs who voted in favour of recognising Palestine.

Fuller stood and won in North East Bedfordshire in the 2019 general election following Alistair Burt's decision  to stand down after having the whip removed and then returned.

Fuller was a member of the Business, Energy and Industrial Strategy Committee from 2015 to 2017 and rejoined the Committee following the 2019 general election. Fuller played a leading role in the inquiry into the sale and acquisition of BHS and later proposed the first successful motion in the House of Commons to recommend the removal of a knighthood.

Fuller campaigned against the use of detention for immigration purposes achieving restrictions on the detention of pregnant women and co-authoring the 2015 report, "The Use of Immigration Detention in the UK" by the All Party Parliamentary Group on Migration. 

Fuller was one of 158 MPs who supported Brexit ahead of the 2016 EU Referendum.

Fuller was appointed Economic Secretary to the Treasury by outgoing Prime Minister Boris Johnson, following the resignation of John Glen during the July 2022 United Kingdom government crisis. He left this position following Prime Minister Rishi Sunak’s first Cabinet reshuffle. He was replaced by Andrew Griffith MP.

References

External links

 Richard Fuller MP official website
 Profile at the Conservative Party

Living people
1962 births
People educated at Bedford Modern School
Conservative Party (UK) MPs for English constituencies
People from Bedford
UK MPs 2010–2015
Alumni of University College, Oxford
Presidents of the Oxford University Conservative Association
Harvard Business School alumni
Politics of the Borough of Bedford
UK MPs 2015–2017
UK MPs 2019–present